Silvana Saldarriaga (born 13 March 1993) is a Peruvian weighlifter. She competed at the 2012 Summer Olympics in the Women's 63 kg, finishing in last place.

References

Peruvian female weightlifters
1993 births
Living people
Olympic weightlifters of Peru
Weightlifters at the 2012 Summer Olympics
Weightlifters at the 2010 Summer Youth Olympics
20th-century Peruvian women
21st-century Peruvian women